The Double Islands are two small rocky islands lying close east of the tip of Zélée Glacier Tongue and  north-northwest of the Triple Islands. They were photographed from the air by U.S. Navy Operation Highjump, 1946–47, and were charted and named by the French Antarctic Expedition, 1949–51.

See also 
 List of Antarctic and sub-Antarctic islands

References 

Islands of Adélie Land